Cram may refer to:
 Cram (surname), a surname, and list of notable persons having the surname
 Cram.com, a website for creating and sharing flashcards
 Cram (Australian game show), a television show
 Cram (game show), a TV game show that aired on the Game Show Network
 Cram (game), an impartial mathematical game similar to domineering
 Cram (software), a flashcard application for Apple devices
 Cram Motorsport, an auto racing team based in Italy

CRAM may refer to:
 NCR CRAM, Card Random-Access Memory, a computer memory technology developed by NCR
 Chalcogenide RAM, Chalcogenide random access memory, a phase-change computer memory technology
 Challenge–response authentication mechanism, a computer security procedure
 Counter-RAM, Counter-Rockets, Artillery and Mortars, a weapons system
 MS-CRAM, also known as Microsoft Video 1, a codec
 CRAM diet, the Cereal, Rice, And Milk diet
 CRAM (file format), a compressed genome sequence alignment file

See also
 Cramming (education), a slang term for last-minute study
 Cramming (fraud), adding inappropriate charges to a bill
 CRAMM, CCTA Risk Analysis and Method Management
 C-RAM (disambiguation)
 Kram (disambiguation)